A grebe is an aquatic diving bird.

Grebe may also refer to:

Geographical features
 Grebe Lake in Yellowstone park
 Grebe River in New Zealand

Military
 , a minesweeper of the US Navy 
 , an air base of Britain's Royal Navy in Alexandria, Egypt
 SUM-N-2 Grebe, a torpedo launcher of the US Navy
 Gloster Grebe, a fighter of Britain's Royal Air force in the 1920s-1930s

People
 Camilla Grebe (born 1968), Swedish novelist
 Alfred H. Grebe (1895-1935), American radio broadcaster
 Stephanie Grebe (born 1987), German table tennis player 
 William Grebe (1869–1960), American fencer
 Wilhelm Grebe, architect for Hitler 
 Konrad Grebe (1907–1972), German mining engineer 
 Michael W. Grebe, American lawyer, philanthropist and conservative activist